Handbagged is a play by the British playwright Moira Buffini, examining the relationship between Elizabeth II of the United Kingdom and Margaret Thatcher, the British prime minister from 1979 to 1990.

Background
Handbagged originated in 2010 as a one act play, with the younger Thatcher played by Claire Cox, and the elder by Stella Gonet, as part of the Tricycle Theatre's Women, Power and Politics festival. The title derives from the verb coined early in Margaret Thatcher's term to evoke the effects emanating from her personal handbag, as it became an emphatic political prop and visible symbol of her power.

The extended version premiered in October 2013 at the Tricycle.

West End production
In April 2014, the play transferred to the Vaudeville Theatre in London's West End, due to run until August 2014.  The cast of this production was:

Marion Bailey - Q, Older Queen Elizabeth II
Stella Gonet - T, Older Thatcher 
Neet Mohan - Actor 1 (various parts, including Neil Kinnock and Nancy Reagan)
Jeff Rawle - Actor 2 (various parts, including Denis Thatcher, Ronald Reagan and Peter Carington, 6th Baron Carrington)
Lucy Robinson - Liz, Younger Queen
Fenella Woolgar - Mags, Younger Thatcher
Katy Brittain - Understudy Q and Liz
Neil Chinneck - Understudy Actor 1 and Actor 2
Genevieve Swallow - Understudy T and Mags

The play toured the UK from September to December 2015 starring Susie Blake and Kate Fahy, with the younger queen portrayed by Emma Handy. It visited Canterbury, Salford, Guildford, Oxford, Coventry, Cambridge, Nottingham, Newcastle-upon-Tyne, Edinburgh, Norwich, Cheltenham, Richmond, Cambridge and Bath.

2022 revival 
The play was revived at the same theatre where it first opened, now renamed the Kiln, running from 11 to 29 October. The cast of this production was:

 Marion Bailey - Q, Older Queen Elizabeth II
 Kate Fahy - T, Older Thatcher
 Romayne Andrews - Actor 1
 Richard Cant - Actor 2
 Abigail Cruttenden - Liz, Younger Queen
 Naomi Frederick - Mags, Younger Thatcher

The director was Indhu Rubasingham, who also directed the 2014 premiere.

References

2010 plays
2013 plays
English plays
Cultural depictions of Margaret Thatcher
Cultural depictions of Elizabeth II
Cultural depictions of Ronald Reagan
Works about prime ministers of the United Kingdom
Works about royalty
Plays based on real people